In mathematical analysis, Littlewood's 4/3 inequality, named after John Edensor Littlewood, is an inequality that holds for every complex-valued bilinear form defined on , the Banach space of scalar sequences that converge to zero.

Precisely, let  or 
be a bilinear form. Then the following holds:

where 

The exponent 4/3 is optimal, i.e., cannot be improved by a smaller exponent. It is also known that for real scalars the aforementioned constant is sharp.

Generalizations

Bohnenblust–Hille inequality
Bohnenblust–Hille inequality is a multilinear extension of Littlewood's inequality that states that for all -linear mapping 
 the following holds:

See also
 Grothendieck inequality

References

Theorems in analysis
Inequalities